The 1910 Georgetown Blue and Gray football team represented Georgetown University during the 1910 college football season. Led by Fred K. Nielsen in his first year as head coach, the team went 6–1–1 and tied with North Carolina A&M for a Southern championship among the South Atlantic teams.

Schedule

References

Georgetown
Georgetown Hoyas football seasons
Georgetown Blue and Gray football